Thúy Nga Inc. (dba Thúy Nga Productions, variously referred to as Thúy Nga Incorporated, Thúy Nga Paris, and Trung Tâm Thúy Nga) is an American entertainment company founded in 1984 in Paris, and currently based in Westminster, California. The private company is known for its Vietnamese-oriented entertainment, such as the variety show and direct-to-video series Paris by Night, and music released as part of the record label Thúy Nga Music.

History

1963–2000: background and founding 
Founder Tô Văn Lai first formed a music company in 1963, in Saigon, South Vietnam, as a precursor for the current company and record label.
After the Fall of the Government of the Republic of Vietnam, the company had to stop operating for a period of time.

Tô began operations for Thúy Nga in 1984, in Paris, France, starting with production for the show Paris by Night. Afterwards, the company transferred to Orange County, California, which has one of the largest Vietnamese populations outside of Vietnam. The company has since produced more shows in the series, along with other videos, and a catalog of albums by various artists from the Thúy Nga Music record label.

2000–present: digital piracy 
In the 21st century, however, the company began to lose revenue due to the piracy of the video and album releases, with chief-executive Marie To commenting, "Profit? We are barely making it." Works released by the company are also banned in Vietnam, which has the largest source of pirates.

Due to the rampant online piracy, Vietnamese entertainment companies have ceased productions, with exceptions being Thúy Nga, Garden Grove-based Asia Entertainment, and Van Son. In 2008, Marie To commented, "Ten years ago, there were about two dozen music studios, now only three labels are active." In 2010, Thúy Nga nearly shut down, narrowly avoiding it due to community support and new business strategies, which included lowering the cost to perform at venues, and increasing advertising.

The company has since moved to social media by 2010, posting videos of Paris by Night performances and full albums on YouTube along with advertising, in order to lure audiences into purchasing the label's works.

Organization
Although production for the company's products include various freelance workers, producers, directors, and such, the full-time staff is limited to about a dozen people. Many singers for the company have originated in Orange County.

In addition to its headquarters at Westminster, California, and its original headquarters in Paris, Thúy Nga also has regional sales and distribution centers in Toronto, Canada and in Bankstown, New South Wales in Australia. The company also transferred part of its Australian distribution rights to a local music center at Footscray, Victoria.

Associated labels
 N-Q Records (1996–1999)
 Như Quỳnh Entertainment (1998–present)

Artists
These artists have released albums (billed as a main artist) under the main Thúy Nga Music label.

 Ái Vân
 Ánh Minh
 Bằng Kiều 
 Don Hồ
 Dương Triệu Vũ
 Hồ Lệ Thu
 Hương Lan
 Hương Thủy
 Lam Anh
 Lynda Trang Đài
 Loan Châu
 Minh Tuyết
 Nguyễn Cao Kỳ Duyên
 Như Loan
 Như Quỳnh
 Phi Nhung
 Quang Lê
 Tâm Đoan
 Thanh Hà
 Thế Sơn
 Thủy Tiên
 Tóc Tiên
 Tommy Ngô
 Trần Thu Hà 
 Ngọc Ngữ

References

External links
 Thúy Nga's worldwide shopping website

Vietnamese music
 
Asian-French culture
American record labels
American record producers
French record labels
Privately held companies based in California
Vietnamese brands
Companies based in Paris
Companies based in Westminster, California
Entertainment companies of Vietnam
1984 establishments in France